Prior to and during the Second World War the US Army called several tractors M2 Light Tractors. Under the Ordnance Corps these "off the shelf" tractors were meant to tow artillery pieces so were not equipped with blades like their Engineer counterparts. Eventually these were replaced by purpose built "High Speed Tractors" (HST). Some tractors were equipped with crane attachments for ammunition, and material handling.

Variants
G007 M2 Light tractor Caterpillar 20
G068 M2 Light tractor Caterpillar R-2
G096 M2 Light tractor AG Cletrac 
G113 M2 Light tractor International T6
International Harvester model T6 W/angle dozer

Gallery

See also
M1 Light Tractor
M1 medium Tractor
M1 Heavy tractor

References

Sources
ORD 3 SNL G-1
TM 9-2800 1943
TM 9-2800 1947

Tractors
World War II vehicles of the United States
Military vehicles of the United States